Wessex Sound Studios was a recording studio located at 106a Highbury New Park, London, England. Many renowned popular music artists recorded there, including Sex Pistols, King Crimson, the Clash, Theatre of Hate, XTC, the Sinceros, Queen, Talk Talk, the Rolling Stones, Pete Townshend, Team Dokus and The Damned. The property was sold to a residential development company in 2003.

History
The building that would become Wessex Studios was built in 1881 as a church hall of St. Augustine's Church. Like other buildings of the Victorian era, it featured Gothic design.

From 1946 to 1949 the hall was the home of the Rank Organisation's 'Company of Youth' - more popularly known as the 'Rank Charm School' - where future stars of British films, such as Diana Dors, Christopher Lee, Barbara Murray and Pete Murray, were tutored and paid about £10/week.  Rank had a film studio in the former Highbury Athenaeum building up the road at 96a Highbury Park where supporting features (B-movies) were made.  That too was closed in 1949.

In the 1960s, the Thompson family converted the church hall into a recording studio. They named it Wessex because their previous recording studio had been located in what was historically the kingdom of Wessex. Les Reed, songwriter of "There's a Kind of Hush" etc. with Barry Mason, the Beatles, bought the building in 1965. In 1975, Chrysalis bought Wessex Studios and George Martin's AIR Studios; Martin became a director of the company. Bill Price was one of the producers who used the studio.

Later purchased by Nigel Frida to become part of the Matrix Recording studios Group in the 1980s, one of the largest independent recording studio complexes in the UK with 5 facilities across London. In 2003, Neptune Group bought the building and later converted it into a residential development known as "The Recording Studio", comprising eight apartments and a townhouse.

References

External links
Neptune Group - Current owner of the building
St. Augustine's Church - The church in front of the building

1960s establishments in England
Religious buildings and structures completed in 1881
Recording studios in London
Former recording studios
Highbury
Gothic Revival architecture in London